Survival of the Freshest is the second album by American rap group Boogie Boys, which was released in 1986 on Capitol Records. The album peaked at #124 on the Billboard 200 and spent nine weeks on the charts. The album had two charting hits, "Girl Talk" and "Share My World."

Track listing
 "Dealin' With Life" – 5:02
 "Girl Talk" – 4:37
 "Starvin' Marvin" – 3:58
 "Share My World" – 5:13
 "Run It" - 4:12
 "Friend Or Foe" – 5:14
 "Love List" – 4:55
 "Colorblind World" – 5:18

Samples
Run It
 "Hang It Up" by Patrice Rushen
Dealin' With Life
 "Superappin'" by Grandmaster Flash and the Furious Five

Personnel
 William "Boogie Knight" Stroman - Vocals
 Joe "Romeo J.D." Malloy - Vocals
 Rudy "Lil' Rahiem" Sheriff - Vocals
 Garry Shider - Background Vocal Arrangement, Background Vocals
 Audrey Wheeler - Backing Vocals
 Bruce Shider - Backing Vocals
 Cindy Mizelle - Backing Vocals
 Craig Stanton - Backing Vocals
 David Sanchez - Backing Vocals
 Kevin Shider - Backing Vocals
 Mallia Franklin - Backing Vocals
 Michael Murry - Backing Vocals
 Nate Shider - Backing Vocals
 Nowell Haskins - Backing Vocals
 Ron Ford - Backing Vocals
 Tim Shider - Backing Vocals
 Tony Terry - Backing Vocals
 Gary Henry - Keyboards
 Cherrie Shepherd - Executive Producer
 Ted Currier – Producer
 John Harris, Steve Peck - Engineer

References 

1986 albums
Boogie Boys albums
Capitol Records albums